The following is a list of hoaxes:

Proven hoaxes
These are some claims that have been revealed or proven definitively to be deliberate public hoaxes. This list does not include hoax articles published on or around April 1, a long list of which can be found in the "List of April Fools' Day jokes" article.

A–F
 Cedric Allingham, fictitious author who wrote a book about meeting the pilot of a Martian spacecraft. Allingham was created by British astronomer Patrick Moore and his friend Peter Davies.
 Alien autopsy, a hoax film by Ray Santilli.
 The Archko Volume, a collection of documents related to the life of Jesus.
 Amina Abdallah Arraf al Omari, a fake Syrian blogger.
 The Awful Disclosures of Maria Monk, a book about the purported sexual enslavement of a nun.
 Sir Edmund Backhouse, 2nd Baronet co-authored the book China Under the Empress Dowager using a forged diary as a major source, with a manuscript of Backhouse's memoirs also being mostly fiction. He also falsely represented himself as representing the Chinese Imperial Court in business deals and donated forged books to the Bodleian Library.
 The Balloon-Hoax, depicting a cross-Atlantic hot air balloon trip.
 The balloon boy hoax, a boy reported to be traveling uncontrollably at high altitudes in a home-made helium balloon but was later discovered to be hiding in the attic of his house.
 Bananadine, a fictional drug made from bananas.
 Bathtub hoax, an imaginary history of the bathtub published by H. L. Mencken.
 Johann Beringer's Lying Stones
 Berners Street hoax in 1810.
 Franz Bibfeldt, a fictitious theologian originally invented to provide a footnote for a divinity school student, which later became an in-joke among academic theologians.
 The Big Donor Show, a hoax reality television program in the Netherlands about a woman donating her kidneys to one of three people requiring a transplantation.
 Bishop Sycamore High School, a fraudulent high school that scheduled matches against elite high school football teams in 2020 and 2021.
 C. W. Blubberhouse, whose letters in UK national newspapers were exposed as a hoax by the Sunday Times.
 Blue waffle, a supposedly contagious sexually-transmitted disease affecting only women, causing a blue discoloration of the vagina.
 Pierre Brassau was a pseudonym for a chimpanzee whose art was exhibited in a gallery under the presumption that Brassau was a real human artist. The chimpanzee received positive reviews from several critics.
 Calaveras Skull was a human skull found by miners in Calaveras County, California, which was purported to prove that humans, mastodons, and elephants had coexisted in California.
 The Cardiff Giant was a hoax of a hoax, when P. T. Barnum had a replica made because he could not obtain the "genuine" hoax item.
 CERN ritual, supposed occult sacrifice on the grounds of CERN.
 The Cottingley Fairies, photographs of cut-out fairies accepted as real.
 Crop circles. English pranksters Doug Bower and Dave Chorley claimed they started the phenomenon, and hundreds of "copycat" circles have been fabricated since by other hoaxers.
 Dahu, a legendary creature well known in France, Switzerland and the north of Italy.
 Disappearing blonde gene
 Document 12-571-3570, supposedly establishing that sex had taken place during a NASA space mission.
 Donation of Constantine, a forged imperial decree by which the 4th-century emperor Constantine the Great supposedly transferred authority over Rome and the Western Roman Empire to the Pope.
 Drake's Plate of Brass, a forgery that purported to be the brass plaque that Francis Drake posted upon landing in Northern California in 1579.
 The Dreadnought hoax, perpetrated in 1910 by Horace de Vere Cole and a group of friends who, pretending to be an official delegation from Abyssinia, tricked the Royal Navy into giving them an official tour of the battleship .
 Drop bear, a supposed dangerous species of koala.
 Emulex hoax, a stock manipulation scheme.
 The English Mercurie, a literary hoax purporting to be the first English language newspaper.
 Fiji mermaid, the supposed remains of a half-fish half-human hybrid.
 Sidd Finch, fictional baseball player. 
 Furry trout

G–M
 Geostationary Banana Over Texas, an apparent hoax to secure artistic funding.
 Going Places, University of Leeds art students used the British media to provoke public debate on the nature of art by pretending to take a week-long fun in the sun holiday to Spain then presenting the holiday as their end-of-year project.
 Google's acquisition of The Walt Disney Company, a hoax about Google acquiring The Walt Disney Company despite Google having no plans to acquire Disney; certain internet users still believe in this hoax.
 Gorgeous Guy, apparently motiveless hoax, which gained the perpetrator some media attention.
 Gosford Glyphs, a supposed group of Egyptian hieroglyphs discovered in the 1970s in Central Coast, New South Wales, Australia.
 "Grávida de Taubaté" (pt), a Brazilian woman who pretended to be pregnant with quadruplets in 2012 and gained national media attention before her pregnancy was revealed to be bogus.
 Great Moon Hoax, a series of articles published in The Sun describing a Lunar civilization.
 Hanxin, a DSP microchip claimed to be developed completely by Chen Jin himself, which was proved as Motorola's microchip with its original trademark sanded away.
 Tania Head (Alicia Esteve Head), who claimed to be a 9/11 survivor and received widespread media attention.
 Joice Heth, an African-American slave exhibited by P. T. Barnum as George Washington's nurse.
 Histoire de l'Inquisition en France, the 1829 book by Étienne-Léon de Lamothe-Langon.
 The Hitler Diaries, purportedly written by Adolf Hitler.
 The Horn Papers, a genealogical hoax.
 Hunting for Bambi, a fictional competition to hunt semi-naked women with paintball guns in the deserts of Las Vegas.
 Hurricane Shark or Street Shark, a recurring hoax appearing to show a shark swimming in a flooded urban area, usually after a hurricane. A 2022 video of such a shark or large fish, however, proved to be real.
 I, Libertine, a hoax perpetrated by Jean Shepherd to manipulate The New York Times Best Seller list, later developed into a real book.
iOS 7 water resistance online hoax
iOS 8 "Apple Wave" microwave charging online hoax
 The Ireland Shakespeare forgeries, a collection of Shakespeare-related documents supposedly discovered by William Henry Ireland and published in 1795 by his father, Samuel Ireland; the discoveries included a "lost" play, Vortigern and Rowena.
 Clifford Irving's biography of Howard Hughes.
 The Jackalope, supposedly a form of rabbit with antlers.
 The Jacko hoax, a supposed gorilla or sasquatch caught near Yale, British Columbia, in 1884.
 Kryakutnoy, purported Russian inventor of the hot-air balloon.
 The Lady Hope Story, a claim of Charles Darwin's deathbed conversion to evangelical Christianity.
 Lenin was a mushroom, a television hoax by Soviet musician Sergey Kuryokhin and reporter Sergey Sholokhov. It was first broadcast on 17 May 1991 on Leningrad Television.
 The Ligma-Johnson hoax, hatched by two amateur actors pretending to be recently fired Twitter employees.
 Lucy Lightfoot, a supposed legend from the Isle of Wight about a girl who disappeared in 1831: later admitted having been made up in the 1960s by the vicar of St Olave's Church, Gatcombe.
 Llandegley International Airport, a non-existent airport indicated by a real roadside sign, since 2002.
 Ern Malley, a fictitious poet.
 Mars hoax (also called the Two Moons hoax), a yearly hoax, started in 2003, falsely claiming that at a certain date Mars will look as large as the full moon. 
 The Masked Marauders, a non-existent album "reviewed" as a prank by Rolling Stone magazine. The album was alleged to feature a jam session between Bob Dylan, Mick Jagger, John Lennon and Paul McCartney. Shortly thereafter, Rolling Stone hired several celebrity impersonators and some session musicians to record this album, and licensed it to Warner Bros. Records, who released it under The Masked Marauders group name in 1969.  
 Eva and Franco Mattes have perpetrated a number of hoaxes, including the fake Vatican web site vaticano.org and the fictitious artist "Darko Maver".
 The Microsoft acquisition hoax, a 1994 hoax claiming that Microsoft had acquired the Roman Catholic Church. The hoax is considered to be the first hoax to reach a mass audience on the Internet. Despite debunking by Microsoft, similar stories about Microsoft and other companies implementing unrealistic acquisitions continued.
 The Miscovich emeralds hoax, an attempt by a diver to pass modern emeralds off as treasures from a sunken Spanish galleon.
The Missing day hoax, a piece of fundamentalist evangelical propaganda claiming that the planets in the Solar System were found to be halted from orbiting the Sun for 24 hours in the ancient past, supposedly reflecting the time when God extended a day for biblical Joshua.
The Momo Challenge hoax, a fake social media challenge supposedly encouraging children to self-harm and kill themselves.
 Monster of Lake Fagua, an 18th-century hoax about a dragon-like monster supposedly found in Spanish Peru.
 Robert Mueller sexual assault hoax, perpetrated by far-right conspiracy theorists Jack Burkman and Jacob Wohl.
 Maggie Murphy hoax, a hoax that claimed a farmer grew an oversized potato.

N–S
 Naked Came the Stranger: a 1969 novel by a group of American journalists attempting to satisfy, and thus expose, what they perceived as degraded standards in popular American literature; it succeeded, selling about 90,000 copies before the hoax was revealed.
 Nibiru cataclysm: a rogue planet and doomsday theory involving a planet collision with Earth. Debunked by NASA and others as a hoax.
 Ompax spatuloides, a "fish" supposedly discovered in 1872 in Australia, made of a mullet, an eel and the head of a platypus, as a joke on Karl Theodor Staiger which also fooled Francis de Laporte de Castelnau into writing a scientific description of the "species".
 The Works of Ossian, "translated" by James MacPherson.
 Our First Time, an early popularized Internet hoax, involving two purported 18-year-olds who claimed they would live broadcast themselves losing their virginity.
 Our Race Will Rule Undisputed Over The World: fake document alleging Jewish superiority over Gentiles by a non-existent rabbi named Emmanuel Rabinovich.
 Edward Owens, perpetrated on the English-language Wikipedia in 2008 by a class at George Mason University.
 The Pacific Northwest tree octopus (Octopus paxarbolis)
 Paul is dead (Paul McCartney death hoax)
 The perpetual motion engines built by John Ernst Worrell Keely and Charles Redheffer.
 The Persian Princess, a mummy of an alleged princess which surfaced in October 2000, which proved to be an archaeological forgery and possibly a modern murder victim.
 Piltdown Man, remains purporting to be "the missing link" between apes and humans.
 Plainfield Teacher's College, a fictional school whose football scores ended up in major newspapers in 1941.
 Platinum Weird, deliberate hoax by David A. Stewart and Kara DioGuardi about a fictitious band from 1974 promoted using false advertising.
 Pompey stone, a stone carved as a hoax in the 1820s and dated to 1520, revealed 1894.
 Cornelis Poortman, a Dutch official of the Dutch East Indies who supposedly recovered 2 Chinese chronicles from Palembang, Sumatra, and Cirebon, Java.
The Poppy Fields, a made-up band that earned a number 24 hit for "45 RPM", a song they had not recorded.
 Princess Caraboo, aka Mary Baker, a woman in England who alleged to be a princess from a far-off land.
 The Priory of Sion, a made-up secret society that plays a prominent role in The Da Vinci Code. 
 Progesterex, a date-rape drug.
 Prophecy of the Popes, a Latin document predicting the next Popes.
 The Protocols of the Elders of Zion, a book instrumental in the surge of antisemitism during the twentieth century. 
 George Psalmanazar and his "Formosa".
 Psychic surgery, a pseudoscientific medical practice where the practitioner pretends to perform surgery on the patient.
 Q33 NY, an Internet hoax based on the 9/11 attacks.
 Quiz show scandals of the late 1950s, presented as legitimate contests even as many of them were completely scripted.
 A Racial Program for the Twentieth Century: fake document.
 Tamara Rand prediction of the 1981 assassination attempt on Ronald Reagan, which was actually made after the fact .
 Redcore, a browser purported to be developed in-house, but was revealed to be based on Chromium
 Rejecting Jane chronicles the rejection by publishing houses of the opening chapters of Jane Austen novels submitted to them under a pseudonym by British writer David Lassman.
 The Report From Iron Mountain, a literary hoax claiming that the United States government had concluded that peacetime was not in the economy's best interest.
 Rosenhan experiment: the admission of healthy "pseudopatients" to twelve psychiatric hospitals.
 Rosie Ruiz, who cheated in the Boston Marathon.
 Frank Scully's 1950 book Behind the Flying Saucers, which claimed that aliens from a crashed flying saucer were being held.
 "Seriously McDonalds", a viral photograph apparently showing racist policies introduced by McDonald's.
 Michael Shrimpton, who perpetrated a hoax that Germany was planning a nuclear attack on the 2012 Summer Olympics.
 The Skvader, a form of winged hare supposedly indigenous to Sweden.
 The 'Sloot Digital Coding System' (SDCS), a method of digital compression devised by Dutchman Jan Sloot which allegedly could compress an entire movie into 8 kilobytes.
 Jussie Smollett hate crime hoax, supposed anti-gay, anti-black attack on the Empire actor in Chicago.
 Songs of Bilitis, supposed ancient Greek poems "discovered" by Pierre Louÿs.
 Southern Television broadcast interruption hoax (1977), hoax message inserted into an IBA broadcast  in the United Kingdom on 26 November 1977.
 Space Cadets, a 2005 TV programme by Channel 4 in which participants were deceived into believing they were on a five-day trip in low Earth orbit.
 Spectra, a 1916 publication heralding a hoax poetry movement.
 Stardrive 2000, a 1986 radio advertising hoax in Portland, Oregon, to promote the effectiveness of radio advertising by advertising a fictional automobile.
 The "R. E. Straith" letter sent to George Adamski by Gray Barker and James W. Moseley .
 James Vicary's subliminal advertising 
 The "Surgeon's Photo" of the Loch Ness Monster.

T–Z
 The Taughannock Giant, a petrified giant "discovered" in Ithaca, New York, in 1879. This copycat hoax was inspired by the Cardiff Giant ten years earlier.
 Manti Te'o girlfriend hoax
 Thatchergate Tapes, a fake conversation with which the punk band Crass fooled the governments of the U.S. and UK.
 Robert Tilton's "prayer cloths".
 Slowing of satellites above Tirunallar Saniswaran Temple, because of mysterious UV rays from Saturn, claimed to have been admitted as a miracle, by NASA
 Mary Toft, the rabbit mother.
 Toothing, an invented fad about people using Bluetooth-enabled mobile devices to arrange sexual encounters.
 Tourist guy, fake photo of a tourist at the top of the World Trade Center building on 9/11 with a plane about to crash in the background.
 Trodmore Racecourse, a fictitious Cornish race meeting.
 Taro Tsujimoto, a fictional Japanese ice hockey player selected by the Buffalo Sabres in the 1974 NHL amateur draft. The Sabres' general manager, Punch Imlach, made the selection as a protest against the NHL's draft procedures.
 The Turk, a chess-playing automaton that actually contained a person.
 Tuxissa, a computer virus hoax.
 Benjamin Vanderford's beheading video.
 Villejuif leaflet, a pamphlet distributed in Europe with claims of various food additives having carcinogenic effects.
 David Weiss, a fictitious person that was used by the Jerusalem Post as a source.
 Laurel Rose Willson's claims to be a survivor of Satanic ritual abuse (as Lauren Stratford), and of the Holocaust (as Laura Grabowski).
 Wolpertinger, a Bavarian cousin of the Jackalope.
 Yellowcake forgery, the false documents suggesting Iraq's Saddam Hussein was to purchase uranium from Niger.
 Zzxjoanw, a fictitious word that fooled logologists for 70 years.

Proven hoaxes of exposure
"Proven hoaxes of exposure" are semi-comical or private sting operations. They usually encourage people to act foolishly or credulously by falling for patent nonsense that the hoaxer deliberately presents as reality. See also culture jamming.

 The Amityville Horror – ghostly events reported by the buyers of a house where another family had been murdered.
 The Atlanta Nights hoax.
 The practice of growing Bonsai Kittens
 The British television series Brass Eye encouraged celebrities to pledge their support to nonexistent causes, to highlight their willingness to do anything for publicity.
 Dihydrogen monoxide hoax
 Disumbrationism
Genpets, the bio-engineered pet creatures.
Grunge speak, an alleged slang of the Seattle rock underground, concocted by a Sub Pop employee and profiled in The New York Times.
 The Canadian House Hippo hoax briefly perpetrated by Concerned Children's Advertisers in public service announcements designed to encourage children to view items in the media with a critical eye.
 ID Sniper rifle, a rifle that shoots GPS chips to mark and track suspects.
 Pacific Northwest tree octopus, by Lyle Zapato.
 Project Alpha – orchestrated by James Randi, exposed poor research into psychic phenomena.
 January 2009 Quadrant Hoax
 Media pranks of Joey Skaggs including Cathouse for Dogs (1976).
 SINA, the Society for Indecency to Naked Animals, the first media hoax of Alan Abel.
 The Sokal affair
 Nat Tate, an imaginary artist, about whom a biography was published in 1998 by William Boyd intended to temporarily fool the art world.
 The Taxil hoax by Léo Taxil, poking fun at the Roman Catholic Church's attitude toward Freemasonry.
 The avant-garde "music" of "Piotr Zak".

Journalistic hoaxes
Deliberate hoaxes, or journalistic fraud, that drew widespread attention include:
 Jayson Blair, reporter for The New York Times
 Cello scrotum is a hoax medical condition originally published as a brief case report in the British Medical Journal in 1974.
 Janet Cooke, who won the Pulitzer Prize for her fictitious Washington Post story about an eight-year-old heroin addict named Jimmy.
 Sidd Finch, a yogi and pitcher who threw 168 mph, supposedly discovered by the Mets and profiled by George Plimpton in Sports Illustrated for April Fool's Day 1985.
 The Flemish Secession hoax of 2006.
 Fuckart & Pimp, a hoax art exhibition at London's Decima gallery, which purported to be the show of a female artist having sex with clients to consummate the sale of her paintings, created a worldwide media scandal but was later revealed to be a hoax.
 Stephen Glass, reporter for The New Republic.
 The Great Moon Hoax of 1835; Edgar Allan Poe would later claim that this was inspired by his own story "The Unparalleled Adventure of One Hans Pfaall," which was published only a few months before.
 Great Wall of China hoax of 1899.
 Johann Hari, journalist for The Independent, The New York Times, The Huffington Post and other media organisations, who committed acts of plagiarism, fabricated sources and quotes, and posted malicious comments to social media and edits to the Wikipedia biographies of his critics and opponents. Hari was forced to return the Orwell Prize (which he won in 2008) after it was withdrawn by the Orwell Prize Council.
 Holocaust teaching controversy of 2007.
 Washington Irving created a hoax about the supposedly missing Diedrich Knickerbocker.
 Jack Kelley, longtime USA Today correspondent.
 Konspiration 58 about the 1958 FIFA World Cup.
 David Lassman who wrote the 2007 "Rejecting Jane" article, which chronicled Jane Austen's rejection by modern-day publishers.
 The New York Zoo hoax of 1874.
 Nik Cohn's New York magazine article, "Tribal Rites of the New Saturday Night", which was the source material for the movie Saturday Night Fever, and which Cohn admitted decades later had been fiction, not reportage.
 David Manning, a fictitious film-critic created by Sony in order to place good quotes on Columbia Pictures' film advertising.
 Edgar Allan Poe created a hoax of moon travel in "The Unparalleled Adventure of One Hans Pfaall," as well as The Balloon-Hoax, a hoax newspaper article about the first transatlantic balloon trip (1844).
 "A Rape on Campus", written by Sabrina Erdely and published by Rolling Stone magazine, reported an alleged gangrape of a female college student by college men in graphic detail, but was later found to have been entirely fabricated by the "victim" and the journalist.
 San Serriffe, a fictional island nation made the subject of an extensive report created for April Fools' Day 1977 by Britain's Guardian newspaper.

See also
Beale ciphers (alleged location of hidden treasure)
Confidence trick
Fool's errand, a type of practical joke where a newcomer to a group, typically in a workplace context, is given an impossible or nonsensical task by older or more experienced members of the group.
List of common misconceptions
List of fictitious people (people it was claimed really existed – unlike fictional characters).
List of hoax commemorative plaques
List of religious hoaxes
List of scholarly publishing hoaxes
Literary forgery
Lost Dutchman's Gold Mine (alleged location of hidden treasure)
Oak Island (alleged location of hidden treasure)

References

Further reading
 
 Boese, Alex, Hippo Eats Dwarf: A Field Guide to Hoaxes and other B.S., Harvest Books 2006, .
 

 
 Curtis Peebles (1994). Watch the Skies: A Chronicle of the Flying Saucer Myth, Smithsonian Institution, .

External links
 Museum of hoaxes – A collection of hoaxes
 Snopes – A database about urban legends

List
Hoaxes
Hoax